Keiraville is an inner suburb of the city of Wollongong, New South Wales, Australia in the Illawarra region. It is situated in the foothills of Mount Keira, approximately three kilometres northwest of Wollongong.

Description

Keiraville has a public school (the Keiraville Public School), post office and several shops located on Gipps Road.

Keiraville (and its neighbour Gwynneville) is known as a university town, home to the main campus of the University of Wollongong.

Another major landmark, Wollongong Botanic Garden, is situated between Northfields Avenue and Murphys Avenue, and includes the Wollongong Conservatorium of Music.

Heritage listings
Keiraville has a number of heritage-listed sites, including:
 Murphys Avenue: Gleniffer Brae

Population
In the 2022 Census, there were 4,002 people in Keiraville. 66.9% of people were born in Australia. The next most common countries of birth were China 9.1% 
and England 3.0%. 71.1% of people spoke only English at home. Other languages spoken at home included Mandarin at 9.1%. The most common responses for religion were No Religion 36.8%, Catholic 18.8% and Anglican 13.2%.

See also
 University of Wollongong
 Wollongong Botanic Garden
 Wollongong Conservatorium of Music

References

External links
 University of Wollongong

Suburbs of Wollongong
City of Wollongong